Coleophora ventadelsolella is a moth of the family Coleophoridae. It is found in Spain.

The wingspan is about 10 mm.

The larvae feed on Artemisia alba. They create a case of 6–8 mm long and a mouth angle of 60-70°.

References

ventadelsolella
Moths of Europe
Moths described in 1981